Nippoptilia regulus is a moth of the family Pterophoridae first described by Edward Meyrick in 1906. It is found in Sri Lanka.

References

Platyptiliini
Moths described in 1906